Odd Squad is a live-action television series that premiered on TVOKids in Canada and PBS Kids in the United States on November 26, 2014, both on the same day. In the UK, the series is broadcast by CBBC. In Latin America, it airs on Discovery Kids. KiKa airs the show in German-speaking European countries.

Series overview

Seasons

Specials

Seasons

Season 1 (2014–16)

Season 2 (2016–19)
Odd Squad was renewed for a second season, which premiered on June 20, 2016, with "Agents of Change", a one-hour special combining the first season's finale with the second season's premiere.

Season 3 (2020–22)

Odd Squad was renewed for a third season, which premiered on February 17, 2020. The third season is titled Odd Squad: Mobile Unit and focuses on an Odd Squad team that travels the world solving odd cases "like a globe-trotting creature or a villain that is causing oddness across multiple towns." The season starts with a one hour special titled: "Odd Beginnings".

Specials

Odd Squad: The Movie (2016)
This is a movie written for the series which premiered on PBS Kids on August 1, 2016, with a one-day theatrical showing in Canada and limited screenings before its television premiere in the United States.

Odd Squad: World Turned Odd (2018)
World Turned Odd, a made-for-TV movie, premiered on January 15, 2018, on PBS.

OddTube

Season 1 (2016–2017)
Agent Olympia (Anna Cathcart) hosted a weekly online video series called OddTube in which she answered questions from fans, toured interesting areas of the Odd Squad headquarters, and met with special guests.

Season 2 (2020)
Season 2 of OddTube launched June 10, 2020, hosted by Agent Orla (Alyssa Hidalgo) in place of Olympia. It also launched a new game called OSMU Van Dashboard, coinciding with the season premiere. It was initially slated to premiere in the fall of 2020 but premiered sooner for an unknown reason.

Odd Squadcast

Season 1 (2020)
Season 1 of Odd Squadcast is a podcast launched November 18, 2020, hosted by The Big O (Millie Davis).   The season was initially slated to premiere in the summer of 2020, but premiered later for an unknown reason.

References

Notes

Lists of American children's television series episodes
Lists of Canadian children's television series episodes

External links
 Official Website
 
 
 OddTube Videos (PBS)
 OddTube Videos (YouTube)
 Odd Squadcast (Apple Podcast)